Heteromicta phloeomima is a species of snout moth in the genus Heteromicta. It was described by Alfred Jefferis Turner in 1911. It is found in northern Australia.

References

Moths described in 1911
Tirathabini